Fangarctia is a genus of tiger moths in the family Erebidae. The genus was erected by Vladimir Viktorovitch Dubatolov in 2003. The moths are found in the Yunnan province in southwestern China.

Species 
 Fangarctia huizensis (Fang, 2000)
 Fangarctia zhongtiao (Fang & Cao, 1984)

References
 , 2003: Three new genera of Chinese Arctiinae (Lepidoptera, Arctiidae). Tinea 17 (5): 255–265, Tokyo.

Spilosomina
Moth genera